Hello FM (Ghana) Hello FM is a private owned local radio station based in the Garden city, Kumasi, Ghana, broadcasts news as well as talk programmes with a strong music and entertainment input. It is one of stations that is ultimately run by the Despite Group of Companies. The station is both active on 101.5fm and online. The station is one of few stations owned and run by the media group company Despite Group of Companies. The station focus on playing African Music and foreign musical genres.

Notable personalities 
Fadda Dickson

Key programmes 
Bello are the list of programs by Hello FM (Ghana):

References

External links 
 HelloFMOnline.com 
 Online Streaming
 Facebook Community/Page

Radio stations in Ghana